Pertusaria lichexanthofarinosa is a rare species of crustose and corticolous (bark-dwelling) lichen in the family Pertusariaceae. Found in Bahia, Brazil, it was formally described as a new species in 2018 by lichenologists André Aptroot and Marcela Eugenia da Silva Cáceres. Pertusaria lichexanthofarinosa is only known to occur at the type locality (part of the Chapada Diamantina mountains), and is only known from the type specimen. The specific epithet lichexanthofarinosa refers both to the presence of the cortical secondary chemical lichexanthone, as well as the farinose (covered with a mealy powder) soredia.

See also
List of Pertusaria species

References

lichexanthofarinosa
Lichen species
Lichens described in 2018
Lichens of Northeast Brazil
Taxa named by André Aptroot
Taxa named by Marcela Cáceres